was a three-piece Japanese rock band from Tokyo, formed in 1989. Part of the city's underground music scene centered in Kōenji, their music has an eclectic sound usually described as psychedelic rock. After 21 years playing together, Yura Yura Teikoku amicably broke up in 2010.

History 
Yura Yura Teikoku was formed in 1989 with drummer Atsushi Yoshida and vocalist/guitarist Shintaro Sakamoto as leader, bassist Chiyo Kamekawa and a succession of other members. Drummer Ichiro Shibata joined in 1997 to form the current lineup, and the trio soon signed with Midi Records. The band released five studio albums, one live recording album and two greatest hits albums on Midi.

In 2005, Yura Yura Teikoku signed with Sony Japan and released their ninth studio album, "Sweet Spot", and a remix 12-inch,"Soft Death / Frankie Teardrop" (Suicide cover). "Soft Death" was embraced by the dance community, and "Sweet Spot" was elected one of the best albums of the year in various media in Japan and overseas. The band also released a live album of material from their Midi years titled "na.ma.shi.bi.re.na.ma.me.ma.i" on New York-based Mesh-Key Records.

In October of the same year, Mesh-Key Records organized two shows for the band in New York (their first shows ever outside Japan), and was welcomed with rave reviews by the local media. New and old fans alike packed into the venues to see the band's one-of-a-kind performance.

In June, 2006, the CD single "Into The Next Night" and remix 12-inch "Into The Next Night / You Can't Fight Fate" were released. In July, Mesh-Key Records released the 12-inch "Soft Death / It Was A Robot" and brought the band back for a second batch of New York shows, which were even more packed than the first. The "Soft Death" 12-inch has been championed by such deejays as Rub'N Tug and DJ Harvey.

In 2006, the band headlined at various major festivals in Japan and Taiwan. In May 2007, Mesh-Key Records released the US version of "Sweet Spot". In the same year, Yura Yura Teikoku went on their first Australian tour.

In July 2007, they released the single "Beautiful" and in fall 2007 they released their first studio album in two and a half years, "Hollow Me". Songs from the album were prominently featured in Sion Sono's 2008 movie Love Exposure. DFA Records combined "Beautiful" and "Hollow Me" for a full-length CD release in November 2009.

As of March 31, 2010, according to the band's official website, after 21 years playing together the band has amicably broken up citing a loss of excitement. Each member plans to continue playing music in other projects in the future.

Shintaro Sakamoto started his own record label, "zelone records", and released his first solo single, "In A Phantom Mood", on October 7, 2011.  He has since released two acclaimed solo albums.

Vocalist Shintaro Sakamoto, who designs all the band's artwork, published his first illustration/artwork anthology, "Shintaro Sakamoto Artworks 1994-2006" (Shogakukan) in July 2007. Bassist Chiyo Kamekawa has been a member of The Stars, led by producer You Ishihara (ex-White Heaven) since 1999. They have released three studio albums.

Members 
  – vocals, guitar
  – bass guitar
  – drums

Discography

Albums 
 (1992) — Yura Yura Teikoku
 (1994) — Yura Yura Teikoku II
 (1995) — Live
 (1996) — Are You Ra?
 (1998) — 3x3x3
 (1999) — Me no Car
 (2001) — III
 (2003) — Yura Yura Teikoku no Shibire
 (2003) — Yura Yura Teikoku no Memai
 (2003) — na.ma.shi.bi.re.na.ma.me.ma.i
 (2005) — Sweet Spot
 (2007) — Hollow Me

Singles 
 (1998) — Hakkoutai
 (1999) — Zukku Ni Rock
 (2006) — Into The Next Night 
 (2010) — Dekinai

EP 
 (1998) — Hakkoutai / Itazurakozou
 (1999) — Taiyou No Shiroi Kona
 (2006) — Soft Death / It Was A Robot
 (2007) — Beautiful

External links 

 Official Website (Japanese/English)
  Yura Yura Teikoku at Mesh-Key Records

Japanese rock music groups
Musical groups from Tokyo